Clavaria versatilis is a species of coral fungus in the family Clavariaceae. It was first described scientifically by French mycologist Lucien Quélet in 1893 as a species of Ramaria. Pier Andrea Saccardo and Alessandro Trotter transferred it to the genus Clavaria in 1912.

References

External links

Clavariaceae
Fungi described in 1893
Fungi of Australia